Chapman High School is a high school located in Inman, South Carolina, United States. The current facility opened in 2006, leaving the previous building for its main influx institution, Mabry Junior High, to expand. The current principal is Dr. Andrew McMillan.

Chapman is the successor to Inman High School as it was outgrown. The school's mascot is a panther, modified from the "purple treadway" used in the early years of the school's establishment in 1954. The colors and "paw" trademark are very similar to those used by nearby Clemson University in Clemson. The logo is now an orange "Block C" with a blue "Panther Head". The school colors are Orange and Blue.

There is a wide array of sports, arts programs and social opportunities, including the Chapman Panthers football team and the National Beta Club.

In 2007, the football team made it to the 2A State Championship for the first time. They finished 12–3 in 2007. They were Region-II 2A Champs (6-0) and 2A Upper State Champions. In 2016, Chapman finished 12–3, making it to the 3-A State Championship and defeating Dillon 29-27 for their first South Carolina State Championship. In 2017, they went 14-1 (3A Upper State Champs) with their only loss coming in the South Carolina State Championship against Dillon. In 2019, the Chapman Panthers went 15–0, becoming one of two undefeated teams in South Carolina. The Chapman Panthers defeated the Dillon Wildcats 44–14 in their 3rd appearance in the 3-A South Carolina State Championship and their 2nd 3-A South Carolina State Championship.

Notable alumni
 Fieldin Culbreth, an umpire in Major League Baseball 
 Deebo Samuel, a player in the National Football League

References

External links
Chapman High School

Educational institutions established in 1954
Public high schools in South Carolina
Schools in Spartanburg County, South Carolina
1954 establishments in South Carolina